Timothy Julian Brooke-Taylor OBE (17 July 194012 April 2020) was an English actor and comedian best known as a member of The Goodies.

He became active in performing in comedy sketches while at the University of Cambridge and became president of the Footlights, touring internationally with its revue in 1964. Becoming more widely known to the public for his work on BBC Radio with I'm Sorry, I'll Read That Again, he moved into television with At Last the 1948 Show, working together with old Cambridge friends John Cleese and Graham Chapman. With Graeme Garden and Bill Oddie, he starred in The Goodies (1970–1982), picking up international recognition in Australia, Canada and New Zealand. He appeared as an actor in various sitcoms and was a panellist on BBC Radio's I'm Sorry I Haven't a Clue for almost 50 years.

Early life and education
Timothy Julian Brooke-Taylor was born on 17 July 1940 in Buxton, Derbyshire, England, son of Edward Brooke-Taylor, a solicitor and games teacher and international lacrosse player Rachel, daughter of Francis Pawson, a parson who played centre forward for the English football team in the 1880s. He was expelled from primary school at the early age of five and a half. Brooke-Taylor was then schooled at Thorn Leigh Pre-Preparatory School, Holm Leigh Preparatory School (where he won a cup for his prowess as a bowler in the school cricket team) and Winchester College which he left with seven O-levels and two A-levels in English and history.

After teaching for a year at Lockers Park School, a preparatory school in Hemel Hempstead and a term back at Holm Leigh School as a teacher, he studied at Pembroke College, Cambridge. There he read economics and politics before changing to read law and mixed with other budding comedians, including John Cleese, Graham Chapman, Bill Oddie, Graeme Garden and Jonathan Lynn in the Cambridge University Footlights Club (of which Brooke-Taylor became president in 1963).

The Footlights Club revue, A Clump of Plinths, was so successful during its Edinburgh Festival Fringe run that the show was renamed as Cambridge Circus and transferred to the West End in London before being taken to both New Zealand and Broadway in the United States in September 1964. Brooke-Taylor was also active in the Pembroke College drama society, the Pembroke Players.

Career
Brooke-Taylor moved swiftly into BBC Radio with the fast-paced comedy show I'm Sorry, I'll Read That Again which he performed in and co-wrote. As the screeching eccentric Lady Constance de Coverlet, he could be relied upon to generate the loudest audience response of many programmes in this long-running series merely with her unlikely catchphrase "Did somebody call?" uttered after a comic and transparent feed-line, as their adventure story reached its climax or cliffhanger ending.  Other members of I'm Sorry, I'll Read That Again were John Cleese, Bill Oddie, Graeme Garden, David Hatch and Jo Kendall.

In the mid-1960s Brooke-Taylor performed in the television series On the Braden Beat with Canadian Bernard Braden, taking over the slot recently vacated by Peter Cook in his guise as E. L. Wisty. Brooke-Taylor played a reactionary City gent who believed he was the soul of tolerance.

In 1967 Brooke-Taylor became a writer/performer on the television comedy series At Last the 1948 Show, with John Cleese, Graham Chapman and Marty Feldman. The "Four Yorkshiremen" sketch was co-written by the four writers and performers of the series. The sketch appears on the DVD of At Last the 1948 Show. Footage of Brooke-Taylor and Cleese from At Last the 1948 Show was shown on the documentary special Monty Python: Almost the Truth (Lawyers Cut). The sketch has since become known for its satirical depiction of Britain's class system and North-South divide.

Brooke-Taylor also took part in David Frost's pilot programme How to Irritate People in 1968, designed to sell what would later be recognised as the Monty Python style of comedy to the American market. Many of the sketches were later revived in the Monty Python TV series, such as the job interview sketch in which Brooke-Taylor played a nervous interviewee tormented by interviewer John Cleese. The programme was also the first collaboration between Cleese and Michael Palin. One of the sketches referred to Cleese's character dating a promiscuous woman named "Christine Wheadon", which was the name of Brooke-Taylor's wife.

Also in 1968 Brooke-Taylor made an unexpected and uninvited guest appearance in an episode of Do Not Adjust Your Set, filling in for Michael Palin who was ill that week. The episode he was in still survives and has been included in DVD compilation sets.

In 1968–69 Brooke-Taylor was also a cast member and writer on the television comedy series Marty starring Marty Feldman, with John Junkin and Roland MacLeod. A compilation of the two series of Marty has been released on a BBC DVD entitled The Best of Marty Feldman. During this period Brooke-Taylor appeared as two characters in the film One Man Band directed by Orson Welles; however, the project was never completed and remains unreleased.

At around the same time, Brooke-Taylor made two series of Broaden Your Mind with Garden (and Oddie joining for the second series). Describing itself as "An Encyclopedia of the Air", the show was a string of comedy sketches (often lifted from I'm Sorry I'll Read That Again), linked (loosely) by a weekly running theme.

The success of Broaden Your Mind led to the commissioning of The Goodies, also with Oddie and Garden. First transmitted on BBC2 in November 1970, The Goodies was a television success, broadcast for over a decade by both the BBC and (in its final year) by ITV contractor London Weekend Television, spawning many spin-off books and successful records.

During the run of The Goodies, Brooke-Taylor took part in the BBC radio series Hello Cheeky, a bawdy stand-up comedy show also starring Barry Cryer and John Junkin. The series transferred to television briefly, produced for ITV by the commercial franchise Yorkshire Television.

He appeared on television in British sitcoms, including You Must Be the Husband with Diane Keen, His and Hers with Madeline Smith and Me and My Girl with Richard O'Sullivan. He also starred in the Radio 4 comedy series Tell Me Where It Hurts in 1979. Brooke-Taylor also appeared regularly in advertisements, including the Christmas commercials for the Brentford Nylons chain of fabric stores and in a public information film for the now-defunct E111 form, since replaced by the European Health Insurance Card.

In 1971 he played the short, uncredited role of a computer scientist in the film Willy Wonka & the Chocolate Factory; his scene was the final one filmed for the movie. After The Goodies on UK television, Brooke-Taylor also worked again with Garden and Oddie on the television animated comedy series Bananaman, in which Brooke-Taylor was the narrator, as well as voicing the characters of King Zorg of the Nurks, Eddie the Gent, Auntie and Appleman. He also lent his voice to the children's TV series Gideon.

Brooke-Taylor appeared in Amnesty International shows: in A Poke in the Eye (With a Sharp Stick) he, Oddie and Garden, sang their hit song "Funky Gibbon", whilst in The Secret Policeman's Other Ball he took part in the sketches "Top of the Form" (with Cleese, Chapman, John Bird, John Fortune, Rowan Atkinson and Griff Rhys Jones), and "Cha Cha Cha" (with Cleese and Chapman). Brooke-Taylor, Garden and Oddie also appeared on Top of the Pops to perform "Funky Gibbon". Garden joined Brooke-Taylor in the theatre production of The Unvarnished Truth.

Other BBC radio programmes in which Brooke-Taylor played a part include the self-styled "antidote to panel games" I'm Sorry I Haven't a Clue, which started in 1972; he took part regularly for over 40 years. On 18 February 1981, Brooke-Taylor, was the subject of Thames Television's This Is Your Life.

In 1997 he appeared in a special episode of One Foot in the Grave.

In 1998 Brooke-Taylor appeared as a guest in one episode of the political satire game show If I Ruled the World.

In 2004, Brooke-Taylor and Garden were co-presenters of Channel 4's daytime game show, Beat the Nation, in which they indulged in typical game show "banter", but took the quiz itself seriously. He appeared on stage in Australia and England, usually as a middle class Englishman. In the early 1980s, he branched out into pantomime as the Dame in Dick Whittington. He was also the author (and co-author) of several humorous books, based mainly on his radio and television work, and the sports of golf and cricket. His interest in golf came to the fore when he took part in the Pro-Celebrity Golf television series (opposite Bruce Forsyth), and appeared in the premiere episode of the BBC's golf-based game show Full Swing.

In 2008, Brooke-Taylor was heard in the Doctor Who audio story The Zygon Who Fell To Earth, made by Big Finish Productions. Paul McGann played the Eighth Doctor and Brooke-Taylor played the part of Mims, a Zygon taking the shape of a human.

Lord Rector of the University of St Andrews
Brooke-Taylor was elected Lord Rector by the students of the University of St Andrews and held office between 1979 and 1982. In this role he represented the students, chaired the University Court and presided over the General Council in the absence of the Chancellor.  At his installation he arrived by helicopter, rode a motorbike and was hauled in an open carriage as part of The Drag. His installation speech included a mother-in-law joke in Latin and a suggestion his successor should be a woman; he was succeeded by Katherine Whitehorn who was elected unopposed as the university's first female rector in 1982. Brooke-Taylor is remembered as an effective Rector who visited the town frequently, took the role seriously, wore a Saltire waistcoat while there and is said to have remarked that St Andrews was "the happiest university" he had been to.

Personal life and death
Brooke-Taylor married Christine Wheadon in 1968 and they had two sons, Ben and Edward. He lived in Cookham Dean, Berkshire and was involved in local events. A keen golfer, he was a member of Temple Golf Club. He was appointed Officer of the Order of the British Empire (OBE) in the 2011 Birthday Honours for services to light entertainment.

Brooke-Taylor died of complications from COVID-19 on 12 April 2020, aged 79, in Cookham, Berkshire. In tribute to Brooke-Taylor, the flag of his alma mater, Pembroke College, Cambridge, was flown at half-mast the following day.

Filmography

Film

Television

Radio

Bibliography
As sole author
Rule Britannia 
Tim Brooke-Taylor's Golf Bag 
Tim Brooke-Taylor's Cricket Box 

As co-author
Brooke-Taylor also co-wrote the following books with the other members of The Goodies:

The Goodies File 
The Goodies Book of Criminal Records 
The Making of The Goodies Disaster Movie

References

External links

 Tim Brooke-Taylor at the British Film Institute

 
Tim Brooke-Taylor – BBC Guide to Comedy
Tim Brooke-Taylor – BBC – I'm Sorry, I Haven't a Clue
Interview: Tim Brooke-Taylor & Graeme Garden – The Goodies, webwombat.com.au
ISIHAC interviews – with Tim Brooke-Taylor, Graeme Garden, and Barry Cryer
Radio Ha Ha interview – Tim Brooke-Taylor discusses his career in Episode 1 of Australian comedy podcast Radio Ha Ha
 "A Clump of Plinths" – the 1963 Cambridge Footlights Club revue – later renamed "Cambridge Circus" (this was the Footlights revue during the time when Tim Brooke-Taylor was President of the Footlights).  Tim was also a member of the revue cast.
Tim Brooke-Taylor: 'Yes, I do miss Humphrey Lyttelton. He told the filthiest jokes'

1940 births
2020 deaths
Alumni of Pembroke College, Cambridge
English male comedians
English comedy writers
English male film actors
English humorists
English male radio actors
English radio writers
English male television actors
English television writers
English male voice actors
People educated at Winchester College
People from Buxton
Rectors of the University of St Andrews
I'm Sorry I Haven't a Clue
Officers of the Order of the British Empire
20th-century English comedians
21st-century English comedians
British male television writers
Deaths from the COVID-19 pandemic in England